Novye Yabalakly (Yañı Yabalaqlı) is a rural locality (a village) in Durasovsky Selsoviet, Chishminsky District, Bashkortostan, Russia. The population was 66 as of 2010. There are 2 streets.

Geography 
Novye Yabalakly is located 26 km south of Chishmy (the district's administrative centre) by road. Dim is the nearest rural locality.

References 

Rural localities in Chishminsky District